Handan railway station is a station in Handan, Hebei. The station is on the Beijing–Guangzhou railway and serves as the eastern terminus of Handan–Changzhi railway and the western terminus of Handan–Jinan railway.

History

The station was opened in 1904.

During 2015-2018, the station underwent a renovation project.

See also

 Handan East Railway Station

References

Railway stations in Hebei
Stations on the Beijing–Guangzhou Railway
Railway stations in China opened in 1904